The 2017 Big West Conference men's basketball tournament was the postseason men's basketball tournament for the Big West Conference. The tournament took place March 9–11, 2017 at the Honda Center in Anaheim, California. The tournament winner, UC Davis, received the conference's automatic bid to the NCAA tournament with a 50–47 win over UC Irvine in the final.

Seeds
The top eight conference teams were eligible for the tournament. Teams were seeded by record within the conference, with a tiebreaker system to seed teams with identical conference records. Teams will reseed after the quarterfinals. Hawaii was initially banned from the postseason for infractions from the previous coaching staff but in the final week of the regular season, Hawaii won their appeal and were reinstated.

Schedule and results

Bracket

References

Big West Conference men's basketball tournament
Tournament
Big West Conference men's basketball tournament
Big West Conference men's basketball tournament